Peter Quinn is a British radio presenter who first appeared at the launch of Independent Local Radio in the UK on Radio Trent in 1975. He has since appeared on many UK and European radio stations as presenter or programmer -  including Radio Caroline, Beacon Radio, TFM, Southern FM Sussex, Smooth Radio, BBC Lincolnshire, Island Sound Malta, Voice of Peace Israel and  The Superstation Orkney, Peter was recently heard on the shortwave broadcaster The Mighty KBC 6095AM and is currently appearing on Cyber Radio UK DAB+.

References

External links
 http://www.offshoreradio.co.uk/djs8q2r.htm
 http://www.hisair.net/interviews/2014/peter-quinn.htm

Living people
Year of birth missing (living people)
Offshore radio broadcasters